The Wade Building is a historic commercial building located at 231 Central Avenue in Hot Springs, Arkansas.

Description and history 
It is a four-story masonry structure, built out of brick, with a dressed stone facade. The ground floor has a commercial storefront, with recessed entrance and plate glass windows sheltered by an awning. The upper floors' bays have windows that decrease in size and level of decoration, with a modillioned cornice and balustraded parapet at the top. The building was designed by the firm of Thompson, Sanders & Ginocchio, and is a well-proportioned example of Classical Revival architecture.

The building was listed on the National Register of Historic Places on December 22, 1982.

See also
National Register of Historic Places listings in Garland County, Arkansas

References

Commercial buildings on the National Register of Historic Places in Arkansas
Neoclassical architecture in Arkansas
Buildings and structures in Hot Springs, Arkansas
National Register of Historic Places in Hot Springs, Arkansas
Commercial buildings completed in 1927